BoF or BOF is an abbreviation for:

Military 
 Battle of Fredericksburg, American Civil War
 Second Battle of Fredericksburg, American Civil War
Bangladesh Ordnance Factories

Movies 
 Balls of Fury, a comedy film
 Boys Over Flowers, a Japanese manga, TV, and movie series

Organizations 
 British Orienteering Federation, the United Kingdom sports body
 Bank of Finland, the Finnish central bank
 Bits of Freedom, a Dutch digital rights organization
 Bangladesh Ordnance Factories, the largest military industrial complex of the Bangladesh Army
 Business of Fashion, a fashion publication

Technology 
 Basic oxygen steelmaking, a furnace used in steel production
 Beginning of file, in computing - see end-of-file
 Breath of Fire, a video game series
 Buffer overflow, a type of exploit for certain software bugs
 Body-on-frame, an automobile construction technique
 Bag of features model in computer vision, an image representation method
 Birds of a feather (computing), informal discussion groups at technology and engineering conferences

Other 
 Battalions of Fear, the debut album of Blind Guardian
 Baptism of fire, English expression based on soldier's first experience under fire in battle
 The Beauty of Fractals, book
 Brandy Old Fashioned, a modification of the Old fashioned cocktail

See also 
 Birds of a Feather (disambiguation)